Dracula Sir is a 2020 Indian Bengali language, Film Noir psychological thriller, non-linear structured film directed by Debaloy Bhattacharya and the film produced by Shrikant Mohata and Mahendra Soni under the banner of SVF. The film starring by Anirban Bhattacharya, Mimi Chakraborty, Bidipta Chakraborty,Rudranil Ghosh,Samiul Alam,Kanchan Mullick,Supriyo Dutta follows the story of a school teacher with a protruding pair of canine teeth, called "Dracula Sir".The film was based on a school teacher who was a Naxalite in his past life.

The film was released in theatres on 21 October 2020, coinciding with Puja hoildays. The film was initially scheduled to release on 1 May 2020, but the film was postponed due to COVID-19 pandemic.  Upon release, Dracula Sir received positive to mixed reviews. Critics praised the performances (Anirban Bhattacharya), the music, costume and makeup, but found the screenplay flawed. The non-linear structured film is based around the story of a revolutionary during the Naxalbari revolution. It was a CPIML party based revolutionary movement around West Bengal which is still going on until 1970's.

Synopsis
This non-linear structured story tells the events that happened in two eras. The story keeps jumping from the present era where Raktim (Anirban Bhattacharya) is a school teacher to the story of Amal (Anirban Bhattacharya), an extremist of the '70s, in the house of his ex-girlfriend Manjari (Mimi Chakraborty). Raktim Chowdhury is a temporary Bengali teacher in a school in Hooghly. The students wrote 'Dracula Sir' on the blackboard due to his two protruding teeth. Amal, A Naxalite Flees To Manjari. The film tales a reincarnation spin.

Cast
 Anirban Bhattacharya as Amal, Raktim
 Mimi Chakraborty as Manjari
 Bidipta Chakraborty as Sobita
 Rudranil Ghosh as Katu Mallick
 Samiul Alam as Nata
 Supriyo Dutta as Bhuban Babu (Katu)
 Kanchan Mullick as the psychiatrist
 Saayoni Ghosh in a special appearance

Soundtrack

The soundtrack of the film is composed by Amit- Ishan, Saqi Banerjee and  Durjoy while lyrics are written by Saqi, Ritam Sen and Debaloy Bhattacharya.

Reception
Madhumanti Pait Chowdhury reviewing for Anandabazar Patrika, felt that backstory of Naxal movement was needed to establish characters and noticed that several scenes in the film and Dracula's costume were similar to Todd Phillips's Joker. Chowdhury opined that stylization has been given importance by creating some scenes for the sake of cinematic beauty. Chowdhury praised Indranath Marik's cinematography and screenplay by Debalaya and Kallol Lahiri, as some aspects were beautifully woven. Chowdhury also praised the music of the film, acting of Anirban, Vidipta Chakraborty, Supriya Dutt, Kanchan Mallick and Rudranil Ghosh but felt that Anirban-Mimi chemistry needed to boost up. Chowdhury opined that the time-travel, the union of the real and the surreal has taken shape in the film divided into eight episodes.

Debolina Sen writing for Times of India gave three stars out of five and termed it as  "A complex tale of life, love and rebirth." Agreeing with Chowdhury she praised the music, costume and makeup. She found screenplay engaging but not without flaws, but direction clear and to-the-point. She also felt that costume was similar to 2019 film Joker. She praised Anirban for portrayals of two different characters of Raktim and Amol from two different eras. Concluding the review she opined, "Dracula Sir is a passionate piece of work that seems to lack in reason at times. But yes, it’s a film you shouldn’t give a miss." Sankhayan Ghosh writing for Film Companion opined that the film was neither a good story nor fun. He felt it was mildly irritating as shortcomings of the screenplay were glossed over with music video like passages.

Award and nomination

References

External links
 
 

2020 films
Bengali-language Indian films
Film productions suspended due to the COVID-19 pandemic
Films postponed due to the COVID-19 pandemic
Indian psychological thriller films
Dracula films
Indian vampire films
Indian nonlinear narrative films
Film noir
Bengali-language nonlinear narrative films